Arthur Charles Wellesley, 4th Duke of Wellington,  (15 March 1849 – 18 June 1934), styled Lord Arthur Wellesley from 1884 to 1900, was a British peer and politician, and a member of the well-known Wellesley family. He joined the military and served in the Household Division. Upon his childless brother's death in 1900, he inherited the family title and estates.

Early life and career 
Wellesley was born in 1849, the second son of Major-General Lord Charles Wellesley and Augusta Sophia Anne Pierrepont. Wellesley's paternal grandparents included the famous Arthur Wellesley, 1st Duke of Wellington, Catherine Pakenham and, on the maternal side, Henry Pierrepont, Lady Sophia Cecil. Between 1861 and 1866, he was educated at Eton. After graduating, Wellesley joined the military. He served as an officer in the Grenadier Guards, the most senior regiment of the Guards' division. The Guards formed part of the Household Division, the elite of the military that provided security for the monarch. To be selected as a member of the Household Division was a great honour, and consequently, recipients received two ranks, one as a member of the Household Division and a second, higher rank, as a member of the armed forces. Wellesley received the rank of Ensign, in his regiment, and Lieutenant, in the British Army, on 13 June 1868. He would later gain the rank of Lieutenant, in his regiment, and Captain, in the British Army, on 15 February 1871.

Later life and career 

Throughout his career Wellesley saw no combat action: his duties were largely ceremonial as part of the Household Guard. He received the rank Captain in his regiment and Lieutenant-Colonel in the British Army on 5 April 1879. Wellesley received the rank of Major in his regiment and Colonel in the British Army on 1 August 1887.

On 8 June 1900, his childless brother Henry died. Wellesley succeeded to all of his brother's titles: Duke of Wellington, Prince of Waterloo, Duke of Ciudad Rodrigo, and Duke of Victoria. The estate also included four advowsons; Wellesley had the duty, right, and obligation to select the chief clergyman of those parishes.

From 1900 until 1934 Wellesley was a member of the House of Lords on the Conservative benches. He was also a member of the Marlborough Club, a gentleman's club.

The Duchess died on 24 June 1927 at Apsley House and was interred on 28 June at Stratfield Saye. Wellesley died at Ewhurst Park (House), Basingstoke, Hampshire, on 18 June (Waterloo Day) 1934, aged eighty-five, and was buried three days later at Stratfield Saye House, Hampshire, the home conferred on the Dukes of Wellington.

His son, Arthur, succeeded him to the Wellesley family estates and titles.

Honours
The Duke received the Knight Grand Cross of the Royal Victorian Order (GCVO) on 1 May 1902. He was appointed a Knight of the Order of the Garter (KG) in the 1902 Coronation Honours list published on 26 June 1902, and was invested by King Edward VII at Buckingham Palace on 8 August 1902. He was also awarded the Spanish decoration of the Grand Cross of Charles III, and the Portuguese decoration of the Grand Cross of the Tower and Sword (GCTE), and the Prussian decorations of the Order of the Black Eagle and the Order of the Red Eagle.

Family 
On 24 October 1872, he married Kathleen Emily Bulkeley Williams, daughter of Captain Robert Griffith Williams (brother of Sir Richard Bulkeley Williams-Bulkeley, 10th Baronet) and wife Mary Anne Geale (daughter of Pears Geale, of Dublin). He and his wife had six children :

Lady Evelyn Kathleen Wellesley (30 July 1873 – 19 January 1922) married Hon. Robert James, had one son
Arthur Charles Wellesley, 5th Duke of Wellington (9 June 1876 – 11 December 1941)
Captain Lord Richard Wellesley (30 September 1879 – 29 October 1914). He was killed during the First Battle of Ypres whilst serving with No. 3 Coy. 1st Bn. Grenadier Guards. He is buried in Hooge Crater Commonwealth War Graves Commission Cemetery in Belgium.
Gerald Wellesley, 7th Duke of Wellington (21 August 1885 – 4 January 1972)
Lady Eileen Wellesley (13 February 1887 – 31 October 1952) married Capt. Cuthbert Julian Orde RFC, had two daughters
Lord George Wellesley (29 July 1889 – 31 July 1967)

Notes

References 

 Lindsay, David (Earl of Crawford), Vincent, John Russell, The Crawford papers: the journals of David Lindsay, twenty-seventh Earl of Crawford and tenth Earl of Balcarres (1871–1940), during the years 1892 to 1940, Manchester University Press ND, 1984 
 Murray, J., Hart's annual Army list, Militia list, and Imperial Yeomanry list, J. Murray, 1891
 Sladen, Douglas Brooke Wheelton, Who's who, Volume 59, A. & C. Black, 1907
 
 
 The World almanac & book of facts, Newspaper Enterprise Association, 1914
 Massue, Melville Henry, The Titled Nobility of Europe: An International Peerage (London: Harrison & Sons, 1914)

External links 

 Duke of Wellington's Regiment  –  West Riding

1849 births
1934 deaths
People educated at Eton College
19th-century English people
Arthur Wellesley, 4th Duke of Wellington
Grenadier Guards officers
Deputy Lieutenants of Hampshire
Dukes of Ciudad Rodrigo
Dukes of Wellington
Dukes da Vitória
Knights Grand Cross of the Royal Victorian Order
Garter Knights appointed by Edward VII
Recipients of the Order of the Tower and Sword
Princes of Waterloo
Wellesley, Arthur 4
Earls of Mornington